Habrodera nitidula is a beetle of the family Cicindelidae.

Description

Distribution
This species occurs in the Afrotropical realm (Mauritania, Senegal, Gambia, Guinea Bissau, Guinea, Sierra Leone, Cameroon, Gabon, Zaire, Equatorial Guinea, Angola.

References

 Universal Biological Indexer
 Zipcodezoo

Cicindelidae
Beetles described in 1825